Hari Sharma (1910-1987) was an Indian career civil servant who formerly served as  Member of Union Public Service Commission and Secretary to Government of India (UT) in Ministry of Home Affairs during the terms of Home Ministers Gulzarilal Nanda, Indira Gandhi and Yashwantrao Chavan.

He was a member of Imperial Secretariat Service and later Central Secretariat Service officer.

Early life and education
Hari Sharma was born in British India and had degrees in Master of Arts and Bachelor of Laws.

Career
He joined the Imperial Secretariat Service during British rule in India and later merged into Central Secretariat Service. He served as Foreign and Political Minister in Patiala State from 1947-48 and was a member of Major States Negotiating Committee, 1947. He was later appointed adviser to Government of India's Delegation to United Nations Security Council in 1948. 

He was appointed Joint Secretary to the Government of India in the Ministry of States from 1950-51 and later appointed  Minister in Government of Rajasthan and then adviser and counsellor to Rajasthan Government, 1951-54. 

He was later appointed Joint Secretary to the Government of India in Ministry of Home Affairs in 1955 and served in this post until 1959. He was later promoted as Additional Secretary to the Government of India (1959-63) and later served as Special Secretary {1964-65}. He was later appointed Secretary to the Government of India {Union Territories) in Ministry of Home where he served from 1965 to 1967. 

He also served as Lieutenant Governor of Goa, Daman and Diu and Member of Union Public Service Commission.

References

External links

 18th Report UPSC (Archived) Union Public Service Commission
 List of former Chairmen and Members of Commission Union Public Service Commission
 List of former Governors of Goa Raj Bhavan, Goa

1910 births
Indian civil servants
Indian government officials
Central Secretariat Service officers
Members of Union Public Service Commission
People from Uttar Pradesh
1987 deaths